Ananthathandesvarar Temple is a Siva temple in Kanjaru in Mayiladuthurai district in Tamil Nadu (India).

Vaippu Sthalam
It is one of the shrines of the Vaippu Sthalams sung by Tamil Saivite Nayanar Appar.

Presiding deity
The presiding deity is known as Ananthathandesvararr. The Goddess is known as Birahannayaki.

Kanjarur
This place is also known as Kanjarur, Ananthathandavapuram and Anathandavapuram.

References

Hindu temples in Mayiladuthurai district
Shiva temples in Mayiladuthurai district